The NEC Shun-Ei was a Nihon-Kiin Go competition.

Outline
The NEC Shun-Ei was made for young stars and was sponsored by the NEC Corporation. The winner's purse was 3,000,000 Yen ($28,000)

Winners

External links
 The NEC Shun-Ei Cup

Go competitions in Japan
NEC Corporation